Alison Liebling,  (born 26 July 1963) is a British criminologist and academic. She has been Director of the Prisons Research Centre at the University of Cambridge since 2000, and Professor of Criminology and Criminal Justice since 2006.

Liebling has degrees from the University of York, University of Hull, and Trinity Hall, Cambridge. Her academic career started as a research assistant at Hull and Cambridge, before being elected a Fellow of Trinity Hall in 1991. She has been a lecturer (2001–2003), Reader (2003–2006), and Professor (since 2006) at the Institute of Criminology within Cambridge's Faculty of Law.

Honours
In 2016, Liebling was awarded the Perrie Award: the associated lecture which she delivered was titled "The cost to prison legitimacy of cuts". In July 2018, she was elected Fellow of the British Academy (FBA), the United Kingdom's national academy for the humanities and social sciences.

Selected works

References

1963 births
Living people
British criminologists
British women criminologists
Legal scholars of the University of Cambridge
Fellows of the British Academy
Alumni of the University of York
Alumni of the University of Hull
Alumni of Trinity Hall, Cambridge
Fellows of Trinity Hall, Cambridge